In Lilac Time (Swedish: När syrenerna blomma) is a 1952 Swedish historical drama film directed by Ivar Johansson and starring Kenne Fant, Nine-Christine Jönsson and Gudrun Brost. It was shot at the Centrumateljéerna Studios in Stockholm. The film's sets were designed by the art director P.A. Lundgren.

Synopsis
In the late nineteenth century Johannes, a Stockholm boy is left by his middle-class parents and brought up in the countryside where he struggles to settle in. The unrelenting hostility is only softened by the kind Charlotta. When he is twenty he returns to the capital city and enlists in the Royal Guards and meets up with Charlotta again.

Cast
 Kenne Fant as 	Johannes Weijner 
 Nine-Christine Jönsson as 	Charlotta aka Trubbnos
 Gudrun Brost as 	Alexandra Weijner
 Eva Stiberg as 	Frida
 Maj-Lis Lüning as 	Julia 
 Åke Fridell as 	Doctor
 John Elfström as 	Gustafson
 Anna-Lisa Baude as 	Emma
 Ingrid Backlin as 	Aina Wickman
 Börje Mellvig as 	Wickman
 Hjördis Petterson as Mrs. Lamberg, 'Bläsan' 
 Willy Peters a John Weijner
 Björn Berglund as Rudolf
 Lissi Alandh as Lena i Härsikeby
 Sten Lindgren as 	August Åhlund
 Hugo Björne as 	King Oscar II
 Olav Riégo as General Sven Lagerberg
 Arthur Fischer as Cobbler Strid

References

Bibliography 
 Qvist, Per Olov & von Bagh, Peter. Guide to the Cinema of Sweden and Finland. Greenwood Publishing Group, 2000.

External links 
 

1952 films
1952 drama films
1950s Swedish-language films
Films directed by Ivar Johansson
Swedish black-and-white films
Films set in the 1880s
Swedish historical drama films
1950s historical drama films
Films based on Swedish novels
Films set in Stockholm
1950s Swedish films